Abie's Irish Rose is a play by Anne Nichols.

Abie's Irish Rose may also refer to:

 Abie's Irish Rose (1928 film), a film directed by Victor Fleming
 Abie's Irish Rose (1946 film), a film directed by A. Edward Sutherland